Ticvaniu Mare is a commune in Caraș-Severin County, western Romania with a population of 1951 people. It is composed of four villages: Cârnecea (Kernyécsa), Secășeni (Krassószékás), Ticvaniu Mare and Ticvaniu Mic (Kistikvány).

References

Communes in Caraș-Severin County
Localities in Romanian Banat